The 2008 Elf Renault Clio Cup United Kingdom season began at Brands Hatch on 29 March and finished after 20 races over 10 events at the same circuit on 21 September. The Championship was won by Ben Winrow driving for Team Pyro.

Changes for 2008
Entries were limited to 36 to ensure that the championship was contested over 20 races.
The series returned to using the double-header race format as seen prior to 2007.

Teams and drivers
All competitors raced in Renault Clio Cup 197s.

Calendar & Winners
The series supported the British Touring Car Championship at nine of the ten rounds. The series skipped the round at Knockhill and instead raced at the World Series by Renault meeting at Silverstone on 7–8 June.

Standings
Points were awarded on a 32, 28, 25, 22, 20, 18, 16, 14, 12, 11, 10, 9, 8, 7, 6, 5, 4, 3, 2, 1 basis to the top 20 finishers in each race, with 2 bonus points for the fastest lap in each race. A driver's best 18 scores counted towards the championship.

Drivers' Championship

Notes:
1. - Ben Winrow was docked one point at Thruxton.
2. - Carl Bradley was docked two points at Thruxton.
3. - Niki Lanik was docked two points at the second Silverstone meeting.
4. - Lea Wood was docked two points at Snetterton.
5. - Alex Dew was docked two points at the second Silverstone meeting.
6. - Stefan Hodgetts was docked three points at Oulton Park.
7. - Peter Felix was docked three points at Donington Park.
8. - Chris Rice was docked two points at Thruxton.
9. - David Shepherd was docked two points at the second Brands Hatch meeting as well as a further six point penalty.
10. - Stephen Tyldsley was docked three points at Donington Park as well as a further six point penalty.
11. - David Dickenson was docked two points at Rockingham.
12. - Chris Law was docked four points at Donington Park as well as a further fifteen point penalty.
13. - Max Hunter was docked two points at the second Brands Hatch meeting.
14. - Jonathan Shepherd was docked two points at Thruxton as well as a further four point penalty.

Winter Cup
The Winter Cup was contested over two rounds at Croft on 1 November and Rockingham on 8 November. It was won by Árón Smith driving for Team Pyro.

Teams & Drivers

Calendar & Winners

Drivers' Championship
Points were awarded on the same scale as the main championship. All scores counted.

External links
 Official website
 Timing Solutions Ltd.

Renault Clip Cup
Renault Clio Cup UK seasons